Mink hunting is a country sport involving the hunting of American mink with scent hounds along the waterways which make up their habitat, in a manner similar to fox hunting. Mink hunting took place in the countryside in the UK and Ireland, but since 2005 traditional mink hunting has been banned in England and Wales.

Origins
When the sport of otter hunting was given up in the British Isles in the late 1970s due to otters becoming endangered, many packs of Otterhounds converted to hunting the invasive American mink, which had become established in Britain from 1950 onward, from fur farm escapees. Unsuccessful efforts to eradicate the mink led to it being widely viewed as an invasive pest in Britain and in Ireland (where a bounty is paid per Mink killed).

Hunting
There are 22 packs of Minkhounds in the UK, registered with the Masters of Minkhounds Association, and four packs in Ireland, registered with the Mink Hounds Association. Mink hunts meet once or twice a week over the Summer, from April to October, and draw waterways searching for mink. Followers try to keep up on foot, which may involve wading across a river. When a mink is found, a chase will ensue, with hounds hunting the scent of the mink until they catch it. It is estimated up to 1,400 mink were killed a year by mink hunts in the UK. Since the 2005 ban, mink hunts in the UK have adapted to the new legislation by undertaking legal trail hunting and other forms of exempt hunting (such as hunting rats).

The hounds used for Minkhunting are usually elderly foxhounds, drafted from foxhound packs, though some packs also use the historic Otterhound breed.

See also
 Fox hunting
 Hunting with hounds
 Hunting Act 2004

References

Hunting with hounds
Hunting by game
Hunting and shooting in the United Kingdom